The politics of Saarland takes place within a framework of a federal parliamentary representative democratic republic, where the Federal Government of Germany exercises sovereign rights with certain powers reserved to the states of Germany including Saarland. The state has a multi-party system where the two main parties are the rightist Christian Democratic Union (CDU) and the leftist Social Democratic Party of Germany (SPD).

Every five years, all Germans residing in the State over the age of 18 elect the members of the Saarland Landtag. This regional parliament or legislature then elects the Minister-President and confirms the cabinet members.

League of Nations 

The "Territory of the Saar Basin" was governed by the League of Nations under the Treaty of Versailles from 1920 until 1935. The Chairmen of the Commission of Government were:

 1920 - 1926: Victor Rault (France)
 1926 - 1927 George Washington Stevens (Canada)
 1927 - 1932 Sir Ernest Colville Collins Wilton (UK)
 1932 - 1935 Sir Geoffrey George Knox (UK)

Nazi Germany 

Saarland voted to rejoin Germany in 1935. The German-appointed Reichskommissar were:

 1935 - 1944: Josef Bürckel (NSDAP)
 1944 - 1945: Willi Stöhr (NSDAP)

Saar protectorate 

From 1947 to 1956, Saarland was controlled by France as a protectorate. Elections were held but pro-German parties were banned.

Minister-Presidents in this time were:

 1945 - 1946: Hans Neureuther, Leader of the Government under French administration
 1946 - 1947: Erwin Müller, Chairman of the Administrative Commission
 1947 - 1955: Johannes Hoffmann, 
 1955 - 1956: Heinrich Welsch (ind)
 1956 - 1957: Dr. Hubert Ney, (CDU)

German state 

Saarland joined the Federal Republic of Germany in 1957. Since then, its Minister-Presidents have been:

 1957 - 1959: Egon Reinert, CDU
 1959 - 1979: Dr. Franz Josef Röder, CDU
 1979 (26 June - 5 July): Werner Klumpp, FDP, interim
 1979 - 1985: Werner Zeyer, CDU
 1985 - 1998: Oskar Lafontaine, SPD
 1998 - 1999: Reinhard Klimmt, SPD
 1999 - 2011: Peter Müller, CDU
 2011 - 2018: Annegret Kramp-Karrenbauer, CDU
 2018–present: Tobias Hans, CDU

The election results have been:

Election 2012 

An election in Saarland was held in March 2012 following the collapse of the experimental Jamaica coalition of the CDU, FDP and Greens. A CDU/SPD grand coalition was formed in its aftermath.

|- bgcolor=#E9E9E9
! colspan="2" align="left" | Party
! Party list votes
! Vote % (change)
! Seats (change)
! Seat %
|- 
| bgcolor= | 
| align="left" | Christian Democratic Union (CDU) 
| 169,594
| 35.2 (+0.7)
| 19 (0)
| 37.25
|- 
| bgcolor= | 
| align="left" | Social Democratic Party (SPD)
| 147,160
| 30.6 (+6.1)
| 17 (+4)
| 33.33
|- 
| bgcolor= | 
| align="left" | Die Linke
| 77,612
| 16.1 (-5.2)
| 9 (-2)
| 17.65
|-
| bgcolor= | 
| align="left" | Pirate Party Germany (PIRATEN)
| 35,646
| 7.4 (+7.4)
| 4 (+4)
| 7.84
|- 
| bgcolor= | 
| align="left" | Alliance '90/The Greens (Grüne)
| 24,248
| 5.0 (-0.9)
| 2 (-1)
| 3.92
|- 
| bgcolor= | 
| align="left" | Family Party (FAMILIE)
| 8,393
| 1.7 (-0.3)
| 0 (0)
| 0
|- 
| bgcolor= | 
| align="left" | Free Democratic Party (FDP)
| 5,871
| 1.2 (-8.0)
| 0 (-5)
| 0
|- 
| bgcolor= | 
| align="left" | National Democratic Party of Germany (NDP)
| 5,604
| 1.2 (-0.3)
| 0 (0)
| 0
|- 
| bgcolor= | 
| align="left" | Free Voters (FREIE WÄHLER)
| 4,172
| 0.9 (+0.9)
| 0 (0)
| 0
|- 
| bgcolor= | 
| align="left" | Die PARTEI
| 2,229
| 0.5 (+0.5)
| 0 (0)
| 0
|- 
| bgcolor= | 
| align="left" | Initiative Direct Democracy (Direkte Demokratie)
| 720
| 0.1 (+0.1)
| 0 (0)
| 0
|- 
|- bgcolor=#E9E9E9
! colspan="2" align="left" | Totals
! 481,249
! 100
! 51
! 100
|}

Election 2017

References